State Road 108 (NM 108) is a state highway in the US state of New Mexico. NM 108's southern terminus is at U.S. Route 60 (US 60), US 70 and  US 84 in Texico, and the northern terminus is at NM 19.

Major intersections

See also

References

108
Transportation in Curry County, New Mexico